Wormleighton is a village in Warwickshire on top of Wormleighton Hill overlooking the River Cherwell, England. The population taken at the 2011 census was 183. 

The original village was by the banks of the Cherwell and can still be seen as a series of humps and hollows on the East bank of the Oxford Canal.
   The present village sits on the crest of the hill. At one end is St Peter's Church, which has a Norman tower and nave, made of local ironstone,  with small added Gothic aisles. It has an graveyard around it, accessible to local sheep, and hints of a circular enclosure. A path from the church takes the visitor directly to the remains of the old 16th-century Manor house, of which the first view is a fine old chimney, then the great hall can be seen, part made of stone, part of brick.  The gatehouse is Jacobean, and has a date of 1613 upon it.  

The manor house was slighted by the Parliamentarians as it was a Royalist stronghold. The village was abandoned after the English Civil War when the Spencer family home Wormleighton Manor was burned down in 1645. The village, however, was refounded in the 19th century, and there is a very fine Arts and Crafts group of buildings, as well as a number of thatched cottages.

The first mention of a post office in the village is in September 1853, when a type of postmark known as an undated circle was issued. The post office closed in 1971. The historic family of Wormleighton is based in the North West of England. During the Second World War, Captain Ronald fought with distinction and was awarded the Victoria Cross in 1944. The Spencer family fortune derived from Sir John Spencer of Wormleighton, Warwickshire, who bought Althorp in 1508 with the huge profits from his sheep-rearing business. In 1498 an inquest jury recorded that 60 villagers had been evicted from the Wormleighton Estate "weeping, to wander in idleness ... perished of hunger".

The Church has remaining box pews, a Norman font, and an interesting tomb to Robert Spencer which gives his death date in 1610 (he died in France) both in the new Gregorian calendar (used in France from 1582) and in the old Julian calendar which was still used in Britain until 1752.

Notable people from Wormleighton
 John Peche
 Spencer family

References

External links

Villages in Warwickshire